ECF Saint Too Canaan College is a Direct Subsidy Scheme (DSS) secondary school in Kwun Tong district, Kowloon. The school has 24 classrooms, 12 special rooms, a hall, library, a covered playground, a basketball court, a volleyball court and a football field.  It is a "millennium-designed" school. As of 2021, there are 24 classes taught at the institute.

External links
 ECF Saint Too Canaan College

Protestant secondary schools in Hong Kong
Kwun Tong District